Novotroitskoye is a rural locality (a selo) in Novotroitsky Selsoviet of Konstantinovsky District, Amur Oblast, Russia. The population was 457 as of 2018. There are 8 streets.

Geography 
Novotroitskoye is located 26 km north of Konstantinovka (the district's administrative centre) by road. Verkhny Urtuy is the nearest rural locality.

References 

Rural localities in Konstantinovsky District